Anina, also known by the pseudonym Anina.net, is an American-born German international fashion model, conference speaker, blogger, fashion technology innovator, wearables developer, and event producer. She is listed as #7 in the Top 100 Women in Wearable and Consumer Tech. Anina is the CEO and founder of 360Fashion Network. Anina evolved from a model to a fashion industry pioneer when she developed Intel Curie-powered shape-shifting robot dresses showcased on ABC7News. Anina went on to develop for Intel the 360Fashion Network's smart gloves worn by 162 dancers on CCTV's Chinese New Year Festival Gala show, "Spring Wind" performance. The smart gloves are powered by Intel's Curie with the LED light pattern generated using gesture recognition. PBS Television shot a documentary about Anina interviewed by Robert Cringely at the start of 360Fashion Network as the first fashion blogger network. PBS Television's Nerd TV interviewed Anina as the 9th guest and the first woman in the series about the future of mobile technology. CRI Radio in China filmed a documentary titled "My China Life". CNet wrote, "In blogs, and Anina, we trust" citing her as one of the star attractions at Les Blogs 2.0.

In the summer of 2019, Anina and 360Fashion Network hosted the Diversity Meets Technology online summit kicking off the launch of 360Fashion tech maker kits at New York Fashion Week and robotic dresses at a Melange Fashion show on September 6, 2019. The diversity and technology online summit is the first of its kind to explore the topics of diverse technologies and people in fashion, technology, business, and innovation, with leaders from the tech and fashion industries including Sandy Carter, Anin and Elliot Carlyle, and many others.

On March 21, 2019, the Museum of Science and Industry in Chicago launched "Wired to Wear," an exhibition featuring 1000 wearables including a wireless charging wallet in hot pink developed by 360Fashion Network and designed by Anina Net. The 360Fashion Network charging wallet in hot pink is named business woman after Sandy Carter, an American business-woman, speaker and author. It was with the help of fashion tech pioneers like Anina Net that MSI museum curators were able to understand what fashion technology is about and also know which key partners they needed to connect with, in the fast-moving tech space. The MSI Chicago Museum shop is also selling 360Fashion Network's products: Urban Mobility Scarf, MetaGem Smart Notification Ring, iLLUMINATED JEWELRY, and LED Ribbon.

Several of Anina's fashion technology products are showcased the at Target Open House in San Francisco, CA, including a wireless charging wallet, 360Fash Tech Kit, and Smart Safety Ring. The 360Fash Tech Kits are for fashion designers who do not code or solder to create smart garments and accessories with 360Fashion Netwoout-of-the-boxe box solutions.

Anina has spoken at several places, including Wearable USA, Printed Electronics USA, FASHIONTECH Berlin, Fashion Futures Korea, AVANTEX PARIS, The Tax office of the Netherlands, The Arts Plus Conference, Codame Art+Tech, Hardware Massive, and Les Blogs.

She has a following in China.  China Central Television awarded her "China's top foreign model" in 2009. She also has her own line of Anime-inspired clothes, "aninaMINEme" and NFC cuffs to easily exchange information while shaking hands. Anina Net has never stopped investigating and educating brands, officials, and consumers about the growing opportunities of the quickly evolving wearable technology market in China.

Anina.net also produces fashion technology events in Asia such as the 360Fashion&Tech Expo (in its 5th year) together with the China National Garment Association CHIC show, which has over 125,000 people in attendance and the first high tech runway fashion show in China at the Mobile World Congress, Shanghai. She produced the IBM 360Fashionboxech Innovation Awards in the United States in November 2015, though her first exhibition was in 2004, called "a new kind of supermodel" at Molière's house in Paris under the art posthume movement. Anina was the first model blogger, starting in 2004 with a document filmed on her Nouvo CH TV in Paris. In 2005 her modeling agency gave her an ultimatum to stop blogging. She refused to quit and was forced to join another agency.

Events produced

References

External links 
 
 360Fashion Network

American bloggers
American emigrants to France
American women bloggers
Living people
Year of birth missing (living people)
21st-century American women